Thomas Higham (11 February 1795 – 1844) was an English artist specialising in an antiquary and topographical engravings. The British Museum has a large collection of his work donated by his nephew William Aldis Wright.

Thomas Higham was born to Thomas Wright and Charlotte Aldis in Bramfield, Suffolk.

Gallery

References

External Links
 Engravings for Fisher's Drawing Room Scrap Books, with poetical illustrations by Letitia Elizabeth Landon:
In Fisher's Drawing Room Scrap Book, 1834, as illustration to Letitia Elizabeth Landon's poem :
 Engraving of Tomb of Ibrahim Padshah, Bejapore painted by Thomas Allom.
 In Fisher's Drawing Room Scrap Book, 1834, as illustration to Letitia Elizabeth Landon's poem :
 Engraving of Jerdair, A hill village, Gurwall, by David Cox.

1795 births
1844 deaths
19th-century English artists